Regalia was launched in Sunderland in 1828. She first appeared in Lloyd's Register (LR) in 1830 with Lotherington, owner and master, and trade London–Trieste.<ref name=LR1830>[https://hdl.handle.net/2027/mdp.39015065537923?urlappend=%3Bseq=786 LR (1830), Supple. pages R", Seq.№R7.]</ref> The Register of Shipping for 1830 had the same information, except that it showed her trade as London–Quebec. In 1831 it showed her trade as Antwerp–Liverpool. LR for 1832 showed her trade as Liverpool–Odessa. It also carried the annotation "LOST".

Loss: Regalia, Lotherington, master, foundered on 13 November 1831 in Liverpool Bay off Southport. She was on a voyage from Liverpool to Lisbon, Portugal. Lloyd's List'' reported on 15 November that pieces of wreck marked "L.M. Regalia" had washed up at Southport. On the 18th it reported that parts of the wreck were coming on shore.

Citations

1828 ships
Age of Sail merchant ships of England
Missing ships
Ships lost with all hands